Porfirio is a given name in Spanish, derived from the Greek Porphyry (porphyrios "purple-clad"). 
It can refer to:

 Porfirio Salinas – Mexican-American artist
 Porfirio Armando Betancourt – Honduran football player
 Porfirio Barba-Jacob –  Colombian poet and writer
 Porfirio Becerril – Mexican diver 
 Porfirio Díaz – Mexican soldier and politician, seven times President  
 Porfirio DiDonna – American artist
 Porfirio Lobo Sosa –  Honduran President 
 Porfirio López – Costa Rican professional soccer player 
 Porfirio Muñoz Ledo –  Mexican politician
 Porfirio Rubirosa –  Dominican diplomat
 Hugo Porfírio – Portuguese footballer

See also
 Porfirio (film), Colombian drama
 Porfirio Díaz (film), 1944 biography
 Porphyry (disambiguation)
 Porphyry (philosopher)
 Porfiry (similar Russian name)